is a retired female Japanese popular music singer. She was affiliated with the Giza Studio recording label for her four-year career.

Biography 
When Hayami Kishimoto was 10 years old at the 5th grade in elementary school in Japan, she began to go to dancing lessons and soon after started singing course as well. The dance style she learnt was primarily Jazz, then advanced into Hip-hop and later lock and House.
Dreaming to be a professional singer and signed a contract with formerly Vision Factory. In October 2002 she tried out for "Dig Star" audition by GIZA Studio, and won the grand champion with her singing and dancing. Those staff at GIZA Studio were so enthusiastic to publish Kishimoto's first single CD, that she debut in eighth month after the audition which was rare those days.

On her birth day on June 25, 2003, GIZA Studio published Kishimoto's first single CD,  that appeared on Oricon single chart in the first week as no.15 and a smash hit. She released 11 single CDs, one mini album, two full album. As a dancer with bold and sharp style, and as a lyricist she spelled out her personal view of love and friendship as a young woman. As a fashion icon who designed jackets, costumes and nail art she put on for her performance, became so popular among girls of her age, and many fashion magazines made her appear on their pages.

Discography

Albums

Studio albums

Extended plays

Singles

As lead artist

Compilation albums 
  (December 2003) by GIZA Records, two CDs, No.7 . GZCA-5044, GZCA-5045.
  (September 2004) by avex trax, one CD and one visual DVD. No.13  AVCD-17523, AVCD-17523B.
  (October 2004) by B-Gram RECORDS, one CD. No.5  JBCJ-9010.
  (November 2004) by B-VISION, two visual DVDs. No.4 Please Mr.Postman (chorus with Rina Aiuchi); no.5  ONBD-7037, ONBD-7038.

References

External links 
 
  (active from December 31, 2005 to April 22, 2008)
 

1987 births
Being Inc. artists
Living people
Musicians from Kyoto
Musicians from Kyoto Prefecture
21st-century Japanese singers
21st-century Japanese women singers